Jürgen "Eddy" Bandura (22 June 1940 – 12 May 2018) was a German professional footballer who played as a left winger.

Career
He was Hannover 96's record appearance holder (with 298 Bundesliga games) until he was overtaken by Steven Cherundolo.

References

1940 births
2018 deaths
Sportspeople from Opole
German footballers
SC Westfalia Herne players
Hannover 96 players
Bundesliga players
Association football wingers
People from the Province of Upper Silesia
West German footballers